2000 was a year.

2000 may also refer to:
 Year 2000 problem
 2000 (number)
 Video 2000
 Rail 2000
 Budd SPV-2000
 Lever 2000
 Lok 2000
 , the tenth most distant known object in the solar system 
 a postal code in Antwerp, Belgium
 2000, the postcode of Sydney central business district, Australia
 Windows 2000, operating system
Microsoft Office 2000, a version of Microsoft Office
 X 2000, high-speed trains in Sweden
 Quasar 2000, a Czech hang glider design

Music and dance
 2000 B.C. (album), a 2000 album by rapper Canibus
 Cusco 2000, an album by the German cross-cultural new age band Cusco
 "2000" (song), a 2009 song by Swedish band Kent 
 2000 Won, a South Korean band
 2000 (breakdance move)
 2000 (Joey Bada$$ album)

Media
 AD 2000, a Catholic traditionalist magazine
 2000 AD (comics), a British science-fiction comic book 
 ABC 2000 Today, a worldwide televised broadcast welcoming the year 2000 with Peter Jennings
 2000 Today a worldwide televised event to welcome 2000 led by the BBC and WGBH
 Double Dare 2000, an American television game show 
 2000FM (Sydney), a radio station with the callsign 2OOO
 2000 Plus, a 1950s American radio series